John Rennie (born 1959) is an American science writer who was the seventh editor in chief of Scientific American magazine. After leaving Scientific American in 2009, he began writing for Public Library of Science (PLoS) Blogs. Rennie has also been involved with several television programs and podcasts as well as multiple writing projects, including his latest position as a deputy editor on the staff of Quanta Magazine.

Biography
John Rennie was born in 1959, near Boston, MA. In 1981, he completed a Bachelor of Science in Biology at Yale University. Rennie then worked for the better part of a decade in a laboratory at Harvard Medical School before commencing his career as a science writer and editor. He began his editorial career with Scientific American in 1989 when he joined its editorial board, becoming editor-in-chief in 1994. Rennie has several published articles in Scientific American, starting with the September 1989 issue and as recently as the December 2013 issue. Rennie has had a varied career in addition to his time as an editor at Scientific American, including positions in higher education, as an author, and as a television host.

Career

Scientific American
Rennie joined the Board of Editors at Scientific American in 1989. In 1994 he was installed as the 7th editor-in-chief for Scientific American, serving in that role until 2009. While editor-in-chief, Rennie was involved in several projects including the launch of its website, authoring articles, and contributing to Scientific American&apos;s podcasts, Science Talk and 60-Second Science.

Television
Rennie has appeared in, or contributed in some other way to, several television programs since the mid-1990s:
 A&E Networks' Scams, Schemes, and Scoundrels
 CNN's Anderson Cooper 360°
 History's Weird U.S. and MysteryQuest
 National Geographic's Naked Science
 The Weather Channel's Hacking the Planet and The Truth About Twisters
 Travel Channel's Mysteries at the Museum
 Science's Space's Deepest Secrets

Other writing
The blog that Rennie authored for PLoS, The Gleaming Retort, primarily focuses on science writing, climate, technology, and health. It was active from September 2010 through December 2014.

Rennie wrote the blog The Savvy Scientist for SmartPlanet between November 2011 and September 2012 and penned a handful of articles for the General Electric sponsored online magazine, Txchnologist, in 2011 and 2012.

In 2017, Rennie joined the staff of Quanta Magazine as a deputy editor.

Higher education
Rennie is listed as adjunct faculty for the graduate Science, Health and Environmental Reporting Program at New York University's Arthur L. Carter Journalism Institute. Rennie also appears as core faculty for Beakerhead's SciComm Lab.

Awards
In 2000, Rennie was awarded the Carl Sagan Award for Public Understanding of Science by the Council of Scientific Society Presidents. In September 2003, he was awarded the Navigator Award from Potomac Institute for Policy Studies.

Selected articles

References

External links

 Faculty profile, NYU
 JohnRennie.net, Official website
 The Gleaming Retort, Official Blog on PLoS

1959 births
Living people
Scientific American people
Harvard Medical School people